6-pyruvoyltetrahydropterin synthase, also known as PTS, is a human gene which facilitates folate biosynthesis.

See also
 6-pyruvoyltetrahydropterin synthase
 6-Pyruvoyltetrahydropterin synthase deficiency

References

Further reading